ICEX may refer to:

 Ice Exercise 2009, a US Naval exercise aimed at practising in Arctic conditions
  Ice Exercise 2016-, a US Naval exercise aimed at practising in Arctic conditions
 Iceland Stock Exchange 
 Indian Commodity Exchange
 Spanish Institute for Foreign Trade (Instituto Español de Comercio Exterior)